The 2021 FIFA Beach Soccer World Cup was the 11th edition of the FIFA Beach Soccer World Cup. Overall, this was the 21st edition of a world cup in beach soccer since the establishment of the Beach Soccer World Championships which ran from 1995 to 2004 but was not governed by FIFA. This was the sixth tournament to take place biennially; the World Cup took place annually until 2009. The tournament took place in Moscow, capital of Russia, between 19 and 29 August 2021.

The tournament was first intimated in November 2017 at the FIFA Beach Soccer Workshop when it was announced that the World Cup would continue to be held every two years for between 2018 and 2024. The bidding process was opened by FIFA in May 2019 and concluded with the selection of Russia as the hosts in October 2019.

Portugal were the defending champions, but they were eliminated in the group stage. They became the first time defending champions in the tournament's history to be eliminated in the group stage.

The hosts Russia, played as the RFU, won their third World Cup, beating Japan in the final.

Host selection
The bidding schedule to determine the hosts was as follows:

9 May 2019 – FIFA opens the bidding process.
5 June 2019 – Deadline for national associations to declare interest of hosting to FIFA.
7 June 2019 – FIFA circulates documents detailing the application campaign and conditions of participation to the bidding associations to analyse.
1 July 2019 – Deadline for associations to reaffirm their bidding intentions by agreeing to the terms of the documents.
30 August 2019 – Deadline for nations to prepare and submit their complete bidding packages to be evaluated by FIFA.
24 October 2019 – Hosts announced by FIFA.

On 11 September 2019, FIFA revealed that three associations had submitted bids through to the final stage of the process:
 (Football Federation of Chile)
 (Salvadoran Football Federation)
 (Russian Football Union)

Confirmation of the awarding of hosting rights to Russia was announced at the FIFA Council meeting in Shanghai, China on 24 October 2019.

Qualification
A total of 16 teams qualified for the final tournament. In addition to Russia who qualified automatically as hosts, 15 other teams qualified from six separate continental competitions.

The process of qualification to the World Cup finals began and ended in 2021.

Qualifying rounds

AFC: The Asian qualifiers were originally due to take place in Thailand from 18 to 28 March 2021. Due to the COVID-19 pandemic, they were initially postponed to between 28 April and 8 May and were subsequently cancelled entirely in January 2021. In place of the qualifiers, AFC handpicked their three representatives to go to the World Cup on 21 April, choosing the best performing nations over the course of the previous three editions of the AFC Beach Soccer Championship. The Iranian Football Federation officially contested the decision which saw their national team not chosen but their efforts were announced as unsuccessful on 28 April.
CAF: The African qualifiers were due to take place in Jinja, Uganda from 23 to 29 November 2020. Due to the COVID-19 pandemic and rising water levels on the shores of Lake Victoria affecting the host beach, Uganda withdrew from hosting. Senegal were subsequently chosen as the new hosts, with the tournament rescheduled, taking place from 23 to 29 May 2021.
CONCACAF: The North American qualifiers took place in Alajuela, Costa Rica from 17 to 23 May 2021.
CONMEBOL: The South American qualifiers took place in Rio de Janeiro, Brazil from 26 June to 4 July 2021.
OFC: The Oceanian qualifiers were due to take place in Tahiti in January 2021. Due to the COVID-19 pandemic, they were initially postponed to take place no later than 6 June 2021 and were subsequently cancelled entirely in May 2021. In place of the qualifiers, OFC handpicked their representative to go to the World Cup, choosing the highest ranked Oceanian nation in the current release of the BSWW World Rankings and considering "recent regional performance".
UEFA: The European qualifiers were due to take place in Jesolo, Italy from 11 to 20 September 2020 but due to the COVID-19 pandemic were postponed and subsequently rescheduled, taking place from 17 to 27 June 2021 in Nazaré, Portugal. Ukraine originally qualified but on 6 July, it was announced that the Ukrainian Association of Football had refused to sanction the participation of the team at the World Cup. It was reported that the decision was made as part of a wider sporting boycott of Russia by Ukrainian authorities due to ongoing tensions between the two states. As the next best-placed team in the qualifiers, Switzerland were chosen to replace Ukraine at the World Cup as lucky losers.

Qualified teams
The following teams qualified to the finals.

Note: The appearance statistics below refer only to the FIFA era of world cups in beach soccer (since 2005); see this article for the inclusion of World Championships era stats (1995–2004).

Venue
One purpose-built venue is being used in the city of Moscow; it is located on the grounds of the Luzhniki Olympic Complex in Khamovniki District.

The arena has a capacity for approximately 4,500 spectators. However, on 4 August 2021 it was announced on that the maximum attendance would be limited to 50% in order to accommodate social distancing measures due to the continuing effects of the COVID-19 pandemic in Russia. Attendees of the arena are expected to wear face coverings at all times, however neither a negative COVID-19 test nor confirmation of vaccine status is required to enter the stadium.

The original bidding documents submitted by the Russian Football Union (RFU) listed the Luzhniki Olympic Complex as the proposed venue, following the success of the location as the setting for the 2019 World Cup qualifiers for UEFA; after the Russian bid was successful, it was decided other locations would be considered. From November 2019 until January 2020, through Moscow's "Active Citizen" online platform for voting on local issues, Muscovites were invited to vote for where in the city they thought the World Cup stadium should be built. Options included the Luzhniki, Sparrow Hills, VDNKh, Victory Park and Red Square. From ~200,000 votes cast, the majority chose the Luzhniki, with 43% of the share of votes. The Luzhniki was subsequently confirmed as the venue in July 2020.

Construction of the temporary structure began on 5 July 2021, at the "Festival Square" area of the complex, outside the front of the Luzhniki Stadium; it was reported as complete on 12 August. 2,000 tons of artificial quartz sand was imported to create the playing surface. It was tested by a specialist laboratory in Canada which compared it favourably to the consistency of natural sand found on Copacabana beach in Rio de Janeiro, Brazil. The sand features a special coating to ensure it maintains its usual viscosity in the event of rain.

Organisation
The following were some of the milestones in the organisation of the tournament (not belonging of other subsections):

General
The Russian Football Union (RFU) delegated the organising of the tournament to its "Directorate of Football Events and Projects" on 15 November 2019.
FIFA delegates met with RFU representatives in Moscow to discuss possible venues, dates and an outline plan leading to the finals, on 17 February 2020.
A budget of US$7 million for the tournament was approved by the FIFA Council, as part of a revised budget for 2019–22, on 25 June 2020.
The dates of the tournament were confirmed publicly on 8 July 2020. Originally slated for the beginning of July 2021, it was moved to August due to the effects of the COVID-19 pandemic.
FIFA and the Local Organising Committee (LOC) held a Zoom meeting together, primarily to assess training facilities that will be in place during the event, on 11 March 2021.
A working meeting was held at the Luzhniki Stadium in Moscow, between members of FIFA and the LOC, on 20 May 2021. At the meeting, it was confirmed that the World Anti-Doping Agency (WADA) had given consent for the tournament to take place as planned in spite of its December 2020 ban on Russia hosting world championships for two years.
Applications for the volunteer program opened on 11 June 2021. Final interviews took place by 9 July. 163 volunteers were picked from 1,200 applicants; training took place from 8–15 August.
FIFA President Gianni Infantino visited the site of the tournament at the Luzhniki to discuss the progress of preparations with the LOC and other authorities on 21 June 2021; he also met with Russian President Vladimir Putin to discuss the tournament.
Media accreditation was opened on 22 June 2021 and ended on 30 July.
Kassir.ru was announced as National Supporter and Official Ticketing Operator of the tournament on 20 August 2021.

Marketing

The official emblem of the tournament, featuring a Firebird, a figure in classic Russian fairy tales, was revealed one year to go until the final, on 29 August 2020.
FIFA and adidas revealed the official match ball, the bright orange "Conext 21 ProBeach", marking three months to the start of the tournament, on 19 May 2021.
The official promotional poster, inspired by Russian culture and Muscovite landmarks, was revealed on 3 June 2021. It portrays a player jumping to compete for an aerial ball with a Firebird; the latter symbolises "the pursuit of glory and embodies fire, light and sun". The ball is depicted as a golden apple, which symbolises both strength and youth, according to Russian folklore. The domes of St. Basil's Cathedral, the Moscow skyline and Luzhniki Stadium also feature. Its colours were chosen based on "Russian motives and architecture". The poster was painted onto a 24x33 metre temporary canvas at the site of the future stadium of the World Cup which took five days to complete by 10 artists.
Tickets went on pre-sale on 9 August 2021 and on general sale from the 12 August, ranging from 400 to 700 rubles in price.
In accordance with the ban by the WADA, RFU announced on 10 August 2021 that the phrase "Our Boys" would replace the Russian emblem on the shirts of its team's players, a two-year old brand of RFU created as part of a campaign to promote unity across all levels of football in Russia.
The official mascot called "Zharishka", an anthropomorphisation of a Firebird, was revealed on 11 August 2021. This marks the first edition of the World Cup to feature an official mascot.

Draw
The draw to split the 16 teams into four groups of four took place on at 14:00 CEST on 8 July 2021 at FIFA headquarters in Zürich, Switzerland. It was conducted by former Portugal captain, Madjer and former captain of the Russia national association football team, Alexey Smertin. It's procedure was as follows:

The teams were first divided into four pots of four based upon a ranking created by considering each team's performances at the World Cup over the past five editions (since 2011); the more recent the tournament, the more weight was given to those results. Bonus points were also awarded to the teams which won their confederation's championship during qualifying. Using this ranking, the best performing teams were placed in Pot 1 (plus the hosts), the next best performers were placed in Pot 2 and so on. What was the composition of the pots is shown below:

The draw started with Pot 1. As the hosts, RFU were automatically assigned to position A1. As the title holders, Portugal were automatically assigned to position D1. The other teams were then drawn – the first out was placed into Group C and the second, D. The teams from Pot 2 were then drawn – the first out was placed into Group A, second into B and so on. The same was repeated for Pots 3 and 4. The exact positions in the groups the teams were allocated to was determined by the drawing of a lot from an auxiliary pot.

Teams from the same confederation could not be drawn into the same group, save for UEFA, for which one group was allowed to contain two members.

Match officials
FIFA has chosen 24 officials from 24 different countries to referee matches at the World Cup, who were revealed on 19 July 2021. At least one referee will represent each of the six confederations: four from the AFC, three from CAF, five from CONMEBOL, three from CONCACAF, one from the OFC and eight from UEFA.

Unlike previous World Cups, a "structured preparation programme" was used to develop an open list of candidates over two years from which the final 24 were then selected.

Squads

Each team had to name a preliminary squad of between 12 and 18 players. From the preliminary squad, the team had to name a final squad of 14 players (three of whom must have been goalkeepers) by the FIFA deadline. Players in the final squad could be replaced by a player from the preliminary squad due to "serious" injury or illness up to 24 hours prior to kickoff of the team's first match.

The final squad lists were revealed by FIFA on 13 August 2021.

Group stage
In the group stage, if a match was level at the end of normal playing time, extra time should be played (one period of three minutes) and followed, if necessary, by kicks from the penalty mark to determine the winner. Each team earned three points for a win in regulation time, two points for a win in extra time, one point for a win in a penalty shoot-out, and no points for a defeat. The top two teams of each group advanced to the quarter-finals.

Tiebreakers
The rankings of teams in each group were determined as follows:

If two or more teams were equal on the basis of the above three criteria, their rankings were determined as follows:

The match schedule was published on the 8 July, following the draw.

All times are local, MSK (UTC+3).

Group A

Group B

Group C

Group D

Knockout stage
In the knockout stage, if a match was level at the end of normal playing time, extra time should be played (a single period of three minutes) and followed, if necessary, by kicks from the penalty mark to determine the winner.

25 and 27 August were allocated as rest days.

Bracket

Quarter-finals

Semi-finals

Third place match

Final

Awards
After the final, FIFA presented individual awards to the three best players of the tournament, three top goalscorers, and to the best goalkeeper. In addition, a collective award was given to the team with the most points in the Fair Play ranking. Following this, the winners' trophy was awarded to RFU's team.

Winners

Individual awards
The individual awards were all sponsored by Adidas, except for the FIFA Fair Play Award. The Golden, Silver and Bronze Balls were awarded by FIFA's Technical Study Group, which includes former players such as Claude Barrabe, Matteo Marrucci and Pascal Zuberbühler.

Statistics

Goalscorers

References

External links
, at FIFA.com
FIFA Beach Soccer World Cup 2021, at Beach Soccer Worldwide

 
2021
Fifa Beach Soccer World Cup
2021 Fifa Beach Soccer World Cup
2021 in Russian sport
August 2021 sports events in Russia